Journey is the eighth studio album by Fourplay, released in 2004.

Reception 

Tom Hull dismissed the album as a "dud" in his "Jazz Consumer Guide" for The Village Voice in September 2004. In a commentary published on his website, he explained, "The old white guys (pianist Bob James, guitarist Larry Coryell) here haven't stretched out in decades, but toss off better licks than your average smooth jazz setup; the not-so-old black guys in the so-called rhythm section have some explaining to do."

Track listing

Personnel 

Fourplay
 Bob James – keyboards
 Larry Carlton – guitars
 Nathan East – bass, vocals (2, uncredited on 1), lead and backing vocals (4)
 Harvey Mason – drums, percussion, vibraphone, drum sequencing

Additional Personnel
 Ken Freeman – synthesizer programming
 Cody "Peyote" Cassiero – DJ (2)
 Bikki Johnson – shaker (4), backing vocals (4)

Production 
 Fourplay – producers (1, 2, 3, 5-10)
 Marcel East – producer (4)
 Don Murray – recording, mixing (1, 2, 3, 5-10)
 Moogie Canazio – mixing (4)
 Ken Freeman – additional engineer, digital editing 
 Ed Woolley – assistant engineer 
 Robert Vosgien – mastering 
 Debbie Johnson – production coordinator 
 Richard Thomas Jennings – art direction, design 
 Bob James – cover artwork
 Jun Sato – photography 
 Air Tight Management – management

Studios 
 Recorded at Firehouse Recording Studios (Pasadena, California) and Pyramid Sound Recording Studios (Ithaca, New York),
 Mixed at Castle Oaks Studios (Calabasas, California).
 Mastered at Capitol Mastering (Hollywood, California).

References 

Fourplay albums
2004 albums
Arista Records albums